Tahereh Khatun (also Romanized as Ţāhereh Khātūn; also known as Tafrakaman) is a village in Bayat Rural District, Nowbaran District, Saveh County, Markazi Province, Iran. At the 2006 census, its population was 259, in 105 families.

References 

Populated places in Saveh County